The 1967 South Vietnam Independence Cup was an invitational men's association football tournament hosted by South Vietnam and played in Saigon during the Vietnam War by national teams from mostly anti-communist nations that supported the American war effort. The tournament was meant to be as a propaganda exercise.

The tournament had previously been held annually since 1961, though only involving South East Asian nations. It was New Zealand's first international tournament and it was to become Australia's first honour in international football. The Australian team toured South East Asia before and after the tournament, winning all ten matches. Eight of the team's players went on to be part of Australia's 1974 FIFA World Cup squad, but their achievement in Saigon was largely overlooked back home.

Matches at Cong Hoa Stadium and training at an army base adjacent to a mine-field were conducted under armed guard and the teams also trained on their hotel roof. The tournament was held during monsoon season and many matches were rainy and muddy. Attendance was around 20,000–40,000 per match. There was unrest at some matches involving Australia: tear gas was deployed for the semi-final against Malaysia and security had to break up a brawl between the teams and the team had rocks thrown at them after they beat the hosts; the vice-president of South Vietnam had promised his team a bonus at half-time to no avail. The final nearly did not take place after Australian military personnel were kept from being spectators until the team threatened a boycott. Despite the previous hostility, the local crowd supported Australia over South Korea in the final. The coach of the Australian team had agreed to let them keep their tracksuits if they won.

The teams complained about the food and conditions at the Caravelle Hotel, where all the teams stayed. An example was when an Australian player was non-fatally electrocuted by a power socket. There may have been a foiled plot to bomb the building. A New Zealand player fell ill and had to stay in hospital for three weeks when his team flew home.

Participants

Group stage

Group A

Group B

Knockout stage

Semi-finals

Third place play-off

Final

References 

Cold War
1967
1967 in Asian football
1967 in Australian soccer
1967 in New Zealand sport
1967 in South Vietnam
Football cup competitions in Vietnam
November 1967 sports events in Asia